The following list is a discography of production by Brandun DeShay, an American rapper and record producer. It includes a list of songs produced and co-produced by year, artist, album and title.

2009

Dom Kennedy – FutureStreet/DrugSounds 
 03. "Where I Belong"

The Super D3Shay - The Super D3Shay 
 04. "Play It Safe"
 07. "We Were" (produced with The Super 3)

Hodgy Beats – The Dena Tape 
 10. "Memorex CDs" 
 15. "Pink Magic" (featuring Casey Veggies)

2010

Dom Kennedy – From the Westside with Love
 07. "Locals Only"

Curren$y – Smokee Robinson
 06. "Racing Stripes" (featuring Dom Kennedy)

Von Pea – So Motivational: The Most Skullduggery of Mixtapes
 06. "Something to Do"
 09. "Fancy Nancy"

Casey Veggies – Sleeping in Class
 02. "Ridin' Roun' Town"
 03. "Hear Me Screamin'"

2011

Sir Michael Rocks – The Rocks Report
 04. "Exing"
 13. "Stagelights'" 
 19. "Don't Wanna Brag"
 23. "Ground Up" (featuring brandUn DeShay)
 25. "Skinny Nigga" (featuring MiBBs)

Danny Brown - XXX
 03. "Pac Blood" 
 04. "Radio Song"
 15. "Party All the Time"

Casey Veggies - Sleeping in Class: Deluxe Edition
 02. "Ridin Roun Town"
 03. "Hear Me Screamin"
 13. "Ridin Roun Town Remix" (featuring Dom Kennedy, C-San, and Kendrick Lamar)

Hollywood Floss - 1 Fan at a Time 
 09. "Stalker"

brandUn DeShay - All Day DeShay: AM 
 01. "Shay Loves To Ball"
 02. "World Famous"
 03. "They Notice" (featuring Rockie Fresh)
 04. "NOW! *OVA*"
 05. "Ur Fresh!"
 07. "Canopy"
 09. "FTW!" (featuring Vic Mensa)
 13. "LATER! *OVA*"
 14. "Canopy Pt. II"

Sir Michael Rocks - Premier Politics
 03. "Thank God"

Mac Miller - I Love Life, Thank You
 01. "I Love Life, Thank You"

Tennille - The Bronx Zoo
 13. "U Broke the Mold" (featuring Nick Bruno)

2012

Ro Ransom – Ransomnia
 02. "Limousine"

Mac Miller – Macadelic
 05. "Aliens Fighting Robots" (featuring Sir Michael Rocks)

Sir Michael Rocks – Premier Politics 1.5
 01. "Antidote"
 10. "New Dress"

SZA - See.SZA.Run 
 03. "Advil"
 05. "Crack Dreams"
 06. "Country"

Pro Era – P.E.E.P: The aPROcalypse
 10. "School High" (performed by Joey Bada$$, Dyemond Lewis, Kirk Knight, and Nyck Caution)
 15. "Last Cypher" (performed by Pro Era)

2013

Uno Hype - Be Good 
 09. "In the Long Run"

Astro - Deadbeats & Lazy Lyrics 
 10. "Grind-In"

Astro - Starvin' Like Marvin For A Cool J Song 
 01. "Intro"
 03. "Hollywood"
 06. "Brooklyn"

Choo Jackson - "Beer Flavored Pizza"
 14. "Old Pictures On The Wall ft. Mac Miller"

Chance The Rapper - Acid Rap
 09. "NaNa" (featuring Action Bronson)

CJ Fly - Thee Way Eye See It 
 12. "Sadderdaze" (featuring Ab-Soul)

Retrospect – The Breakout: Part 1
 04. "We Came Last"

Primavera Vills - Basic Math 
 07. "Life's a Bitch" (produced with Primavera Vills)

SZA - S 
 04. "The Odyssey"

2014

Kitty - Impatiens 
 02. "Morgan Stop"

The Underachievers - Cellar Door: Terminus Ut Exordium 
 07. "Metropolis"

Astro - Computer Era 
 02. "U Know" (featuring Nathaniel)

OG Swaggerdick - Game Boy Colored 
 09. "Red & Meth" (featuring Cam Meekins)

2015

Mega Ran and Sammus - Gone 
 01. "Gone"

Reddy - 취권 (Chi Kwon) 
 01. "취권 (Chi Kwon)" (featuring brandUn DeShay)

2016

Audio Push - Inland City Blues 
 01. "Inland City Blues"

Dumbfoundead - We Might Die 
 04. "We Might Die"

Pell - EP 
 01. "All In A Day's Work"

2017

Year of the Ox - YOX EP 
 07. "Jetlag"

RAU DEF - UNISEX 
 02. “現象 “Genshow”

2018

Dumbfoundead - Rocket Man EP 
 03. "Kill Me"

INNOSENT in FORMAL - The night late show 
 02. "Footloose"

kZm - DIMENSION 
 05. "WANGAN"

2021

Ace Hashimoto - VAPORWAVES 

 "VAPORWAVES" (featuring Thundercat)

Ace Hashimoto - PLAY.MAKE.BELIEVE 

 04 "2NITE" (featuring Taichi Mukai) [produced with Slom]
 05 "TRAK STAR (featuring Tkay Maidza)
 06 "Great Indoors" (featuring Devin Morrison & Sir Michael Rocks)
 07 "Bad Habits" (featuring Ta-Ra)
 08 "Affection"
 09 "4EVERYTHING" (featuring Kero One)
 10 "Nice To Know You"
 11 "Etika's Interlude"
 12 "I Feel Fly" (featuring Mon’ Aerie)
 13 "Ending Theme"

2022

brandUn DeShay - We On 

 'We On' (featuring Mac Miller & Sir Michael Rocks)

Ace Hashimoto 

 "CALI 2 JPN" (featuring 5LACK)
 "YOU WON'T COME BACK"

Upcoming

References 

Deshay, Brandun